This is a list of private schools in Bacolod, Negros Occidental, Philippines.

A
ABE International Business College – Bacolod Campus
AMA Computer College – Bacolod Campus

B

Bacolod Christian College of Negros
Bacolod Tay Tung High School

C

Castleson High
Colegio San Agustin – Bacolod
College of Arts & Sciences of Asia & the Pacific – Bacolod Campus

J

Jack and Jill School 
John B. Lacson Colleges Foundation – Bacolod

L

La Consolacion College Bacolod

M

Mapúa Malayan Digital College – Learning Hub Bacolod
Maranatha Christian College - High School

O

Our Lady of Mercy College – Bacolod

R

Riverside College (Philippines)

S

STI West Negros University
St. Joseph School – La Salle
St. Benilde School
St. Scholastica's Academy – Bacolod
St. John's Institute (Hua Ming)
Scola Guadalupana

U

University of Negros Occidental – Recoletos 
University of Saint La Salle

V

VMA Global College

External links
 Official website of the Bacolod City local government

 
Bacolod